The Cherry Street Strauss Trunnion Bascule Bridge is a bascule bridge and Warren truss in Toronto, Ontario, Canada. Located in the industrial Port Lands area, it carries Cherry Street over the Toronto Harbour Ship Channel and opens to allow ships to access the channel and the turning basin beyond. There are two bascule bridges on Cherry Street.  The other, smaller bridge, crosses the Keating Channel, while this bridge crosses the Ship Channel.

The bridge was built in 1930 by the company of Joseph Strauss and the Dominion Bridge Company. The north side of the bridge has 750-ton concrete counterweights that allow the bridge to pivot to open. The bridge uses 500 tons of steel in its construction. The bridge is designed to carry two lanes of traffic. It cost  ($ in  dollars) to build. It was officially opened on June 29, 1931 by Toronto Mayor William Stewart. The bridge was listed under the Ontario Heritage Act by the City of Toronto in 1992 as architecturally historical.

The city spent  to refurbish the bridge in 2007.

See also 
Cherry Street lift bridge

List of bascule bridges

References

Bibliography

External links

Bridges in Toronto
Bascule bridges
Bridges completed in 1930
Road bridges in Ontario
Bridges by Joseph Strauss (engineer)
City of Toronto Heritage Properties